Bill Myers is an American Christian author, film director and film producer. He was born in Seattle, Washington on September 9, 1953.

Myers is most notable for the animated series McGee and Me! He is an author of books from many genres, including comedy, horror, thriller, fiction, and non-fiction. He has written over 80 books.

Biography 

Myers attended the University of Washington and the Italian State Institute for Cinema and Television and began writing and directing independent films. Later he began to write books and novels for children, teens, and adults in the inspirational market.

His video series McGee and Me! is about a typically average, mild-mannered boy named Nicholas Martin, who has what appears to be an imaginary friend named McGee. The series chronicles the boy's adventures, ending with him learning a moral or spiritual lesson.

He is the author of Bloodhounds Inc., a series of Christian comedy/detective books for children. Beginning in 2001, Marcia Silen Films produced a video/DVD series adapted from Bloodhounds, Inc. which featured Richard Thomas and Richard Kiel. Another children's book series he authored is "The Incredible Worlds of Wally McDoogle."

Myers also writes adult novels; his 2000 novel Eli presents the story of Jesus transposed to a contemporary setting. He has authored books for children, teens, and adults. He is president of Amaris Media International, a TV, film, and media production company.

Filmography
Where Eagles Fly (1977)
My Brothers Keeper (1978)
A Long Way Home (1980)
More Than a Champion (1981)
The Winning Circle (1981)
One Heartbeat Away (1982)
Cry Freedom (1982)
Choices (1983)
Bamboo in Winter (1990)
Secret Agent Dingledorf and His Trusty Dog, Splat (2019)
McGee and Me!
The Not-So-Great Escape (1989)
Big Lie (1990)
Skate Expectations (1990)
Star in the Breaking (1990)
Twas the Fight Before Christmas (1990)
Twister and Shout (1990)
Take Me Out of the Ball Game (1993)

Works

Series
 Journeys to Fayrah / The Imager Chronicles (different names for the same series), collected as the Bloodstone Chronicles
 The Incredible Worlds of Wally McDoogle
 Forbidden Doors
 Fire of Heaven
 Blood of Heaven,
 Threshold
 Fire of Heaven
Eli
The Face of God
When the Last Leaf Falls
The Judas Gospel
The God Hater
 Bloodhounds Inc.
 Secret Agent Dingledorf And His Trusty Dog, Splat
 Soul Tracker
The Presence
The Seeing
 TJ and the Time Stumblers
The Elijah Project
Truth Seekers
Harbingers

Novels
 Eli (2000),
 When the Last Leaf Falls (2001),
 The Face of God (2002),
 The Wager (2003),
 The Voice (2008),
 The God Hater (2010),
 "Angel of Wrath" (2009),
 " truth seekers" the machine (2013)

Bloodhounds, Inc. series
The Ghost of KRZY (1997), 
The Mystery of The Invisible Knight (1997), 
Phantom of the Haunted Church (1998), 
Invasion of the UFO's (1998), 
Fangs for the Memories (1999), 
Case of the Missing Minds (1999) 
The Secret of the Ghostly Hot Rod (2000) 
I Want My Mummy (2000) 
The Curse of the Horrible Hair Day (2001) 
The Scam of the Screwball Wizards (2001) 
Mystery of the Melodies from Mars (2002) 
Room with a Boo (2002)

Non fiction
 The Dark Side of the Supernatural: Learning What Is of God...and What Is Not (1999), (with David Wimbish) Remake (2008) 
 Faith Encounter (1999),
 Just Believe It: Faith in the Real Stuff (2001),
 The Jesus Experience
 When God Happens I
 When God Happens II

Additional bibliography 
 Hot Topics, Tough Questions (1987)
 Jesus: An Eyewitness Account (1988)
 More Hot Topics (1989)
 More Hot Topics: Rip Offs (1989)
 Christ, B.C: Becoming Closer Friends with the Hidden Christ of the Old Testament (1990)
 Baseball for Breakfast: The Story of a Boy Who Hated to Wait (1999)
 Then Comes Marriage: A Novella (2001) (with Angela Elwell Hunt)

References

Websites 
 Author's Official Website
 Author's Official Children's Books Website
 Zondervan Profile 
 Bill Myers information 
 
 Internet Book List For McGee and Me 
 Complete Wally McDoogle book list

Christian writers
American film directors
Living people
1953 births